Tabuenca is a municipality located in the province of Zaragoza, Aragon, Spain. According to the 2010 census the municipality has a population of 412 inhabitants. Its postal code is 50547.

The town is located in a mountainous area west of the Moncayo Massif, close to the Sierra de Tabuenca, also known as Sierra del Bollón, after its highest peak,  El Bollón' (1036 m).

See also
Campo de Borja
List of municipalities in Zaragoza

References

External links 

 Tabuenca en Campo de Borja

Municipalities in the Province of Zaragoza